The Association Sportive Dragons FC de l'Ouémé known as Dragons de l'Ouémé is a football club in Benin, playing in the town of Porto-Novo. They play in the Beninese first division, the Benin Premier League.

Achievements
Benin Premier League: 12
1978, 1979, 1982, 1983, 1986, 1989, 1993, 1994, 1998, 1999, 2002, 2003.

Benin Cup: 6
1984, 1985, 1986, 1990, 2006, 2011.

Benin Independence Cup: 1
2000.

African Cup Winners Cup
1987: Semi-finals

Performance in CAF competitions
CAF Champions League: 4 appearances
1999: Preliminary Round
2000: First Round
2003: Preliminary Round
2004: First Round

 African Cup of Champions Clubs: 7 appearances

1979: First Round
1980: First Round
1983: First Round

1984: Second Round
1990: Preliminary Round
1994: First Round

1995: First Round

CAF Confederation Cup: 2 appearances
2007: Preliminary Round
2012:

CAF Cup Winners' Cup: 7 appearances

1985: Quarter-finals
1986: First Round
1987: Semi-finals

1988: First Round
1991: First Round
1993: Second Round

1998: First Round

CAF Cup: 3 appearances
1992: Second Round
1996: First Round
1997: Preliminary Round

Current squad
Squad for the 2019–20 Benin Premier League

The 1987 African Cup Winners Cup Epopee
In 1987, the Dragons de l'Oueme, led by a Dream Team composed of Abédi Pelé, Peter Rufai, Gangbo Bashirou, Kingston Ashabi and with the vision and ambition of late Gbadamassi Moucharaf (then club chairman) reached the semi-finals at the African Cup Winners Cup. In the semi-finals, the Dragons de l'Oueme lost by 2–3 to Gor Mahia of Kenya.

Managers
 Moussa Latoundji (1995)
 Karim Abdul Razak (1999–2000)

External links
Team profile – soccerway.com''

Dragons
Sport in Porto-Novo